"Mario" is a song by Congolese guitarist Franco and his group TPOK Jazz from his eponymous 1985 album. It is considered to be the musician's biggest hit.

Written and composed by Franco, the theme of the song is the story of a gigolo who lives with an older woman. Although he is a graduate, he prefers to spend his partner's money.

“Mario” was reportedly certified gold after selling over 200,000 copies in Zaire. The song has been recorded three times by TPOK Jazz (each with different interpretations of Mario's story): the original, "Mario 2" (also released in 1985) and "Mario 3" (released in 1987 on the album "L'Animation Non Stop"). The song was also covered by several artists including salsa group Africando and rapper Marshall Dixon.

Background 
The Kinshasa society had a slippage at the time when Franco composed "Mario". Young girls publicly preferred mature men for financial reasons. The same goes for young boys, they preferred mature women. This inspires Luambo to compose the song.

Recording 
The song was recorded in 1985 under the direction of Elvis Kemayo at Studio Mademba during a trip of the group TPOK Jazz to Libreville.

Composition 
"Mario" is a Congolese rumba song. It was composed in the key of C-flat major, with a moderate tempo of 115 beats per minute. "Mario" has an C, F, G, F chord progression throughout the song.

The song begins with Franco's mi-solo guitar, he is then joined by rhythm guitarist Gégé Mangaya. Drums (played by Nado Kakoma), congas (played by Dessoin Bosuma) and bass (played by Decca Mpudi) also come in when Mangaya's guitar starts up. Franco pronounces the first lines of the song, followed by the chorus, sung by Madilu System. The solo guitar is played by Papa Noel Nedule.

"La Réponse de Mario" 
A sequel to the hit "Mario" was recorded in 1987 under the title "La Reponse De Mario" (Mario's response). An answer from the target of the previous song where he gives his version of the story: according to him, it is rather the mature woman who comes to seek him, humiliates him in front of women of his age, forces him to be his lover and interferes in his studies.

Credits 
Musicians who participated in the recording of "Mario (original version)":

 Franco Luambo – songwriter, lead and spoken vocals, mi-solo guitar
 Madilu System – lead vocals
 Papa Noel Nedule – lead guitar
 Gégé Mangaya – rhythm guitarist
 Decca Mpudi – bass guitar
 Nado Kakoma – drums
 Dessoin Bosuma – congas

References 

1985 songs
1985 singles